Timothy Anthony Moynihan (September 23, 1907 – April 4, 1952) was an American football player and coach. He played professionally for two seasons in the National Football League (NFL) with the Chicago Cardinals. Moynihan played as a center at the University of Notre Dame under head coach Knute Rockne and was a member of the undefeated 1929 team. He served as an assistant football coach at Notre Dame, Texas, Denver, and Georgetown. He coached interscholastic football at St. Xavier College in Cincinnati. He coached baseball at the University of Denver.

Moynihan was one of 11 All-American football players to appear in the 1930 film Maybe It's Love.

He died in Los Angeles on April 4, 1952 from injuries sustained during an automobile accident.

References

1907 births
1952 deaths
American football centers
Chicago Cardinals players
Denver Pioneers baseball coaches
Denver Pioneers football coaches
Georgetown Hoyas football coaches
Notre Dame Fighting Irish football players
Notre Dame Fighting Irish football coaches
Texas Longhorns football coaches
Xavier Musketeers football coaches
Sportspeople from Chicago
Road incident deaths in California
Players of American football from Chicago